The Nevada High-Speed Rail Authority (NHSRA) is a Nevada state agency established pursuant to the Nevada High-Speed Rail Act (S.B. 457) to develop and implement high-speed intercity rail service and to find contractors to build the line. The authority is headed by a chairman, and the position is currently occupied by George Smith. The Nevada High-Speed Rail Authority is headquartered in Las Vegas, Nevada.

History 
The bill was first introduced on April 7, 2015, and was passed into law on May 20, 2015, by a vote of 40–1.

Purpose 
The authority is intended to select a franchisee to construct and operate a high-speed rail system in Nevada, which is to be known as the Nevada High-Speed Rail System. In 2015, they selected Brightline West as the company who shall be constructing the high-speed rail system that connect Las Vegas to Southern California. As of 2021, the first track is meant to connect Los Angeles and California, with the first few stations being Victorville, Rancho Cucamonga, and Palmdale, though progress is still ongoing.

See also 

 High-speed rail in the United States
 Rail transportation in the United States

References

External links
Nevada High-Speed Rail Authority

High-Speed Rail Authority
Government agencies established in 2015
Passenger rail transportation in Nevada
High-speed rail in the United States
2015 establishments in Nevada
2015 in rail transport
United States railroad regulation
Public utilities established in 2015